= Mandian =

Mandian may refer to:

- Mandian, Pakistan
- Mandian, a village in Anhui, China
- Mandaeism
